Ozaki Dam is a gravity dam located in Fukuoka Prefecture in Japan. The dam is used for water supply. The catchment area of the dam is 0.1 km2. The dam impounds about 4  ha of land when full and can store 386 thousand cubic meters of water. The construction of the dam was started on 1974 and completed in 1978.

References

Dams in Fukuoka Prefecture
1978 establishments in Japan